Oblavce is a village in the municipality of Staro Nagoričane, North Macedonia. It used to be part of the former municipality of Klečevce.

Demographics
According to the 2002 census, the village had a total of 124 inhabitants. Ethnic groups in the village include:

Macedonians 123
Serbs 1

References

Villages in Staro Nagoričane Municipality